Herman Pieter de Boer (9 February 1928 – 1 January 2014), also known as Johnny Austerlitz, was a Dutch writer, journalist and lyricist, whose career spanned over 55 years.

Born in Rotterdam, South Holland, de Boer began his writing career in 1956 and wrote fifty novels.

Herman Pieter de Boer died following a long illness during the early hours of 1 January 2014, aged 85, in Eindhoven, North Brabant.

References

External links

1928 births
2014 deaths
Dutch male writers
Dutch journalists
Dutch male songwriters
Officers of the Order of Orange-Nassau
Writers from Rotterdam